A bolted joint is one of the most common elements in construction and machine design. It consists of a male threaded fastener (e. g., a bolt) that captures and joins other parts, secured with a matching female screw thread.  There are two main types of bolted joint designs: tension joints and shear joints.

Joint types
In a tension joint, the bolt and clamped components of the joint are designed to transfer an applied tension load through the joint by way of the clamped components by the design of a proper balance of joint and bolt stiffness. The joint should be designed such that the clamp load is never overcome by the external tension forces acting to separate the joint. If the external tension forces overcome the clamp load (bolt preload) the clamped joint components will separate, allowing relative motion of the components.

The second type of bolted joint transfers the applied load in shear of the bolt shank and relies on the shear strength of the bolt. Tension loads on such a joint are only incidental. A preload is still applied but consideration of joint flexibility is not as critical as in the case where loads are transmitted through the joint in tension. Other such shear joints do not employ a preload on the bolt as they are designed to allow rotation of the joint about the bolt but use other methods of maintaining bolt/joint integrity. Joints that allow rotation include clevis linkages, and rely on a locking mechanism (like lock washers, thread adhesives, and lock nuts).

Proper joint design and bolt preload provides useful properties:
 For cyclic tension loads, the fastener is not subjected to the full amplitude of the load; as a result, the fastener's fatigue life is increased or, if the material exhibits an endurance limit, its life extends indefinitely.
 As long as the external tension loads on a joint do not exceed the clamp load, the fastener is not subjected to motion that would loosen it, obviating the need for locking mechanisms. (Questionable under Vibration Inputs.)
For the shear joint, a proper clamping force on the joint components prevents relative motion of those components and the fretting wear of those that could result in the development of fatigue cracks.

In both the tension and shear joint design cases, some level of tension preload in the bolt and resulting compression preload in the clamped components is essential to the joint integrity. The preload target can be achieved by a variety of methods: applying a measured torque to the bolt, measuring bolt extension, heating to expand the bolt then turning the nut down, torquing the bolt to the yield point, testing ultrasonically, or by applying a certain number of degrees of relative rotation of the threaded components. Each method has a range of uncertainties associated with it, some of which are very substantial.

Theory 
Typically, a bolt is tensioned (preloaded) by the application of a torque to either the bolt head or the nut. The applied torque causes the bolt to "climb" the thread causing a tensioning of the bolt and an equivalent compression in the components being fastened by the bolt. The preload developed in a bolt is due to the applied torque and is a function of the bolt diameter, the geometry of the threads, and the coefficients of friction that exist in the threads and under the torqued bolt head or nut. The stiffness of the components clamped by the bolt has no relation to the preload that is developed by the torque. The relative stiffness of the bolt and the clamped joint components do, however, determine the fraction of the external tension load that the bolt will carry and that in turn determines preload needed to prevent joint separation and by that means to reduce the range of stress the bolt experiences as the tension load is repeatedly applied. This determines the durability of the bolt when subjected to repeated tension loads. Maintaining a sufficient joint preload also prevents relative slippage of the joint components that would produce fretting wear that could result in a fatigue failure of those parts.
  

The clamp load, also called preload of a fastener, is created when a torque is applied, and so develops a tensile preload that is generally a substantial percentage of the fastener's proof strength. Fasteners are manufactured to various standards that define, among other things, their strength. Torque charts are available to specify the required torque for a given fastener based on its property class (fineness of manufacture and fit) and grade (tensile strength).

When a fastener is torqued, a tension preload develops in the bolt and an equal compressive preload develops in the parts being fastened. This can be modeled as a spring-like assembly that has some assumed distribution of compressive strain in the clamped joint components. When an external tension load is applied, it relieves the compressive strains induced by the preload in the clamped components, hence the preload acting on the compressed joint components provides the external tension load with a path (through the joint) other than through the bolt. In a well designed joint, perhaps 80-90% of the externally applied tension load will pass through the joint and the remainder through the bolt. This reduces the fatigue loading of the bolt.

When the fastened parts are less stiff than the fastener (those that use soft, compressed gaskets for example), this model breaks down and the fastener is subjected to a tension load that is the sum of the tension preload and the external tension load.

In some applications, joints are designed so that the fastener eventually fails before more expensive components. In this case, replacing an existing fastener with a higher strength fastener can result in equipment damage. Thus, it is generally good practice to replace old fasteners with new fasteners of the same grade.

Calculating the torque 
Engineered joints require the torque to be chosen to provide the correct tension preload. Applying the torque to fasteners is commonly achieved using a torque wrench. The required torque value for a particular fastener application may be quoted in the published standard document, defined by the manufacturer or calculated.  The side of the threaded fastening having the least friction should receive torque while the other side is counter-held or otherwise prevented from turning.

A common relationship used to calculate the torque for a desired preload takes into account the thread geometry and friction in the threads and under the bolt head or nut. The following assumes standard ISO or National Standard bolts and threads are used:

where 
 is the required torque
 is the nut factor
 is the desired preload
 is the bolt diameter

The nut factor K accounts for the thread geometry, friction, pitch. When ISO and Unified National Standard threads are used the nut factor is:

where
 = the mean thread diameter, close to pitch diameter.
 = nominal bolt diameter
 = (thread pitch)/(pi * dm)
Thread Pitch = 1/N  where N is the number of threads per inch or mm
 = friction coefficient in the threads
 = half the thread angle (typically 60°) = 30° 
 = friction coefficient under torqued head or nut

When  =  = 0.15, the dimensions used correspond to any size coarse or fine bolt, and the nut factor is K ≈ 0.20, the torque/preload relationship becomes:

A study of the effect of torquing two samples, one lubricated and the other unlubricated, 1/2 in.- 20 UNF bolts to 800 lb-in, produced the same mean preload of 7700 lbf. The preloads for the unlubricated bolt sample had a standard deviation from the mean value of 1100 lbf, whereas the lubricated sample had a standard deviation of 680 lbf. If the preload value and torques are used in the above relation to solve for the nut factor it is found to be K = 0.208, which is very close to the recommended value of 0.20

The preferred bolt preload for structural applications should be at least 75% of the fastener's proof load for the higher strength fasteners and as high as 90% of the proof load for permanent fasteners. To achieve the benefits of the preloading, the clamping force must be higher than the joint separation load. For some joints, multiple fasteners are required to secure the joint; these are all hand tightened before the final torque is applied to ensure an even joint seating.

The preload achieved by torquing a bolt is caused by the part of the torque that is effective. Friction in the threads and under the nut or bolt head uses up some fraction of the applied torque. Much of the torque applied is lost overcoming friction under the torqued bolt head or nut (50%) and in the threads (40%). The remaining 10% of the applied torque does useful work in stretching the bolt and providing the preload. Initially, as the torque is applied, it must overcome static friction under the head of the bolt or nut (depending on which end is being torqued) and also in the threads. Finally, dynamic friction prevails and the torque is distributed in a 50/40/10 % manner as the bolt is tensioned. The torque value is dependent on the friction produced in the threads and under the torqued bolt head or nut and the fastened material or washer if used. This friction can be affected by the application of a lubricant or any plating (e.g. cadmium or zinc) applied to the threads, and the fastener's standard defines whether the torque value is for dry or lubricated threading, as lubrication can reduce the torque value by 15% to 25%; lubricating a fastener designed to be torqued dry could over-tighten it, which may damage threading or stretch the fastener beyond its elastic limit, thereby reducing its clamping ability.

Either the bolt head or the nut can be torqued. If one has a larger bearing area or coefficient of friction it will require more torque to provide the same target preload. Fasteners should only be torqued if they are fitted in clearance holes.

Torque wrenches do not give a direct measurement of the preload in the bolt.

More accurate methods for determining the preload rely on defining or measuring the screw extension from the nut. Alternatively, measurement of the angular rotation of the nut can serve as the basis for defining screw extension based on the fastener's thread pitch. Measuring the screw extension directly allows the clamping force to be very accurately calculated. This can be achieved using a dial test indicator, reading deflection at the fastener tail, using a strain gauge, or ultrasonic length measurement.

Bolt preload can also be controlled by torquing the bolt to the point of yielding. Under some circumstances, a skilled operator can feel the drop off of the work required to turn the torque wrench as the material of the bolt begins to yield. At that point the bolt has a preload determined by the bolt area and the  yield strength of the bolt material. This technique can be more accurately executed by specially built machines. Because this method only works for very high preloads and requires comparatively expensive tooling, it is only commonly used for specific applications, primarily in high performance engines.

There is no (as yet) simple method to measure the tension of a fastener in situ. All methods, from the least to most accurate, involve first relaxing the fastener, then applying force to it and quantifying the resultant amount of elongation achieved. This is known as 're-torqueing' or 're-tensioning' depending on which technology is employed. 

Technologies employed in this process can be:

An electronic torque wrench is used on the fastener in question, so that the torque applied can be measured as it is increased in magnitude.

Recent technological developments have enabled tensions to be established (± 1%) by using ultrasonic testing. This provides the same accuracy to that of strain gauging without having to set strain gauges on each fastener.

Another method that indicates tension (mainly in erecting steel) involves the use of crush-washers. These are washers that have been drilled and filled with orange RTV. When a given force has been applied (± 10%), orange rubber strands appear.

Large-volume users (such as auto makers) frequently use computer-controlled nut drivers. With such machines, the computer is in control of shutting off the torque mechanism when a predetermined value has been reached.  Such machines are often used to fit and tighten wheel nuts on an assembly line, and have also been developed for use in mobile plant tire fitting bays on mine sites.

Thread engagement
Thread engagement is the length or number of threads that are engaged between the screw and the female threads. Bolted joints are designed so that the bolt shank fails in tension before the threads fail in shear, but for this to hold true, a minimum thread engagement must be achieved. The following equation defines this minimum thread engagement:

Where Le is the thread engagement length, At is the tensile stress area, D is the major diameter of the screw, and p is the pitch. This equation only holds true if the screw and female thread materials are the same. If they are not the same, then the following equations can be used to determine the additional thread length that is required:

Where Le2 is the new required thread engagement.

While these formulas give absolute minimum thread engagement, many industries specify that bolted connections be at least fully engaged. For instance, the FAA has determined that in general cases, at least one thread must be protruding from any bolted connection.

Failure modes 
When doing a failure mode analysis for bolts that have broken, come loose or corroded, careful consideration must be given to the below Failure Modes:

Overloading
Overloading occurs when operating forces of the application produce loads that exceed the clamp load, causing the joint to loosen over time or fail catastrophically.
Over-torquing
Over-torquing might cause failure by damaging the threads and deforming the fastener, though this can happen over a very long time. Under-torquing can cause failures by allowing a joint to come loose, and it may also allow the joint to flex and thus fail under fatigue.
Fatigue Failure
When Axial or Transverse Loading overcomes the bolts preload or causes the bolt to slip transversely, movement in the bolt can cause small cracks to build up in the material eventually leading to Fatigue Failure of the bolt or male threaded component. According to Bill Eccles from boltscience, [In the vast majority of applications, the most effective way to ensure that the bolt is fatigue resistant is to ensure that it is tightened sufficiently...]
Brinelling
Brinelling may occur with poor quality washers, leading to a loss of clamp load and subsequent fatigue failure of the joint.
Other Failure modes
Other modes of failure include corrosion, embedment, and exceeding the shear stress limit.

Bolted joints may be used intentionally as sacrificial parts, which are intended to fail before other parts, as in a shear pin.

Locking mechanisms 

Locking mechanisms keep bolted joints from coming loose. They are required when vibration or joint movement will cause loss of clamp load and joint failure, and in equipment where the security of bolted joints is essential. A prevalent test for the self-loosening behaviour is the Junker test.
Jam nuts
Two nuts, tightened on each other.  In this application a thinner nut should be placed adjacent to the joint, and a thicker nut tightened onto it.  The thicker nut applies more force to the joint, first relieving the force on the threads of the thinner nut and then applying a force in the opposite direction.  In this way the thicker nut presses tightly on the side of the threads away from the joint, while the thinner nut presses on the side of the threads nearest the joint, tightly locking the two nuts against the threads in both directions.
Prevailing Torque Nuts (locknuts)
An insert on the internal threads (either metallic or non-metallic, e.g. Nyloc nut) or a plug/patch of non-metallic material on the external threads is installed. This material binds against the threads of the opposing fastener with a friction force and creates a prevailing torque, which resists the backing-out or loosening of the fastener. 
Chemical locking compounds (thread-locking fluid)
The use of a chemical locking compound binds the threads together when the compound cures. Examples of such a compound includes anaerobic compounds such as Loctite, which cures in the absence of oxygen and acts as an adhesive to lock the threads of the joint together. Chemical locking methods create friction after the breakaway torque. The prevail torque is usually higher than zero since the cured polymer still creates friction when rotating the nut.
Safety wire (lockwire)
Holes are drilled in nuts and bolt heads, and wire is threaded through the holes to prevent back-rotation.  This method of locking is labor intensive, but is still used on critical joints.
 Locknuts
 Some portion of the nut deforms elastically during tightening to provide a locking action.
 Spring washers and lock washers
 A washer that bends axially during tightening. Spring washers create additional axial force whereas lock washers have parts that engage the surfaces in a way to provide more direct resistance against rotation.

Bolt banging

Bolt banging occurs in buildings when bolted joints slip into "bearing under load", thus causing a loud and potentially frightening noise resembling a rifle shot that is not, however, of structural significance and does not pose any threat to occupants.  

A bolted joint between two elements may act as a bearing-type joint, or a friction joint.  In the friction joint, the elements are clamped together with enough force that the resultant friction between the clamped surfaces prevents them from slipping laterally over each other.

In the bearing joint, the bolt itself limits lateral movement of the elements by the shank of the bolt bearing upon the sides of the holes in the clamped elements.  Such joints require less clamping force, because a high level of friction between the clamped surfaces is not required. The clearance between the bolt and the holes means that some lateral movement may occur before the bolt bears against the sides of the holes. 

Even when designed as a bearing joint, the surface friction between the clamped elements may be sufficient to resist movement for some time, especially when the building may not yet be fully loaded – thus it operates initially as a friction joint.  When the lateral force becomes sufficient to overcome this friction, the clamped elements move until the sides of the holes bear against the shank of the bolt.  This movement – "slip into bearing" – usually starts and stops very suddenly, often releasing elastic energy in the associated elements, resulting in a loud but harmless bang.

International standards 
 SA-193/SA-193M: "Specification for alloy-steel and stainless steel bolting materials for high-temperature service"
 SA-194/SA-194M: "Specification for carbon and alloy steel nuts for bolts for high-temperature service"
 SA-320/SA-320M: "Specification for alloy steel bolting materials for low-temperature service"
 EN 1515: "Flanges and their joints - Bolting"
 EN 1515-1: "Flanges and their joints - Bolting - Part 1: Selection of bolting"
 EN 1515-2: "Flanges and their joints — Bolting — Part 2: Classification of bolt materials for steel flanges, PN designated"
 EN 1515-2: "Flanges and their joints — Bolting — Part 3: Classification of bolt materials for steel flanges, class designated"
 ISO 4014: "Hexagon head bolts - Product grades A and B"
 ISO 4017: "Hexagon head screws - Product grades A and B"
 ISO 4032: "Hexagon nuts, style 1 - Product grades A and B"
 ISO 4033: "Hexagon nuts, style 2 - Product grades A and B"

See also 

 Bearing surface
 Bolt manufacturing process
 Castellated nut/capscrew (common in the aircraft industry)
 Flanges (bolted in pairs}
 Junker test
 Locknut (prevailing torque nuts)
 Nyloc nut
 Distorted thread locknut
 Lock wire
 Mechanical joint
 Quenching and tempering (Q&T)
 Rivet
 Residual stress
 Thread adhesive

References 
Notes

Bibliography

External links 

 Bolted Joint Calculator
 Bolt Formulas and Calculators
 The banging bolt syndrome AISC
 Banging bolts — another perspective AISC
 Bolt Science - The Jost Effect
 Threaded Fasteners - Tightening to Proper Tension US Department of Defense document MIL-HDBK-60, 2.6MB pdf.
 Fastener Design Manual, NASA-RP-1228, 100pp, 1990 NASA handbook, 5.1 Mb, pdf.
 Mechanics of screws
 FAA Advisory Circular 43.13-1B, Paragraph 7-37 "Grip Length"
 Bolted Joint Analysis
 Bolted Joint Design, Fastenal Engineering & Design Support

Threaded fasteners
Mechanical engineering
Structural connectors

vi:Ốc vít#Bu lông